Chrysocrambus lambessellus is a moth in the family Crambidae. It was described by Aristide Caradja in 1910. It is found in North Africa, where it has been recorded from Algeria.

References

Crambinae
Moths described in 1910